Plethobasus cyphyus, the sheepnose mussel, is a species of freshwater mussel, an aquatic bivalve mollusk in the family Unionidae, the river mussels.

This species is endemic to the Midwest and Southeast United States. It is currently listed as endangered as it is no longer in two-thirds of its historical range.

References

Molluscs of the United States
cyphyus
Bivalves described in 1820
Taxa named by Constantine Samuel Rafinesque
ESA endangered species
Taxonomy articles created by Polbot